The Castle of the Pyrenees (Le Château des Pyrénées) is an oil on canvas painting by the Belgian surrealist René Magritte, completed in 1959. The painting depicts a large rock floating above a sea and topped by a stone castle. Magritte's friend Harry Torczyner, a lawyer and author, commissioned the painting and chose its theme. The painting is displayed in the Israel Museum in Jerusalem along with Magritte's correspondence with Torczyner.

The painting is one of several Magritte works depicting stones, which were a frequent theme in his 1950s work. The work was influenced by the French expression "châteaux en Espagne", or castles in Spain, which refers to impossible dreams; the Pyrenees mountain range runs along the border between France and Spain. It is one of Magritte's most reproduced paintings and has been cited as an inspiration by artists such as John Baldessari, Edward Ruscha, and Martin Kippenberger.

References

Paintings by René Magritte
1959 paintings